The 2001–02 Western Kentucky Hilltoppers men's basketball team represented Western Kentucky University during the 2001–02 NCAA Division I men's basketball season. The Hilltoppers were led by Sun Belt Conference Coach of the Year Dennis Felton and All-American Center Chris Marcus.  The team won the East Division Championship and the Sun Belt Basketball tournament, earning an automatic bid to the 2002 NCAA Division I men's basketball tournament.  One of the highlights of the season was a victory over in-state rival, 4th ranked Kentucky.  Marcus missed 17 games this season due to an ankle injury.  David Boyden and Derek Robinson were named to the All SBC team.  Marcus and Patrick Sparks made the SBC All-Tournament team and Robinson was the tournament MVP.

Schedule

|-
!colspan=6| Regular season
 
|-

 

|-
!colspan=6| 2002 Sun Belt Conference men's basketball tournament

|-
!colspan=6| 2002 NCAA Division I men's basketball tournament

Rankings

References

Western Kentucky
Western Kentucky Hilltoppers basketball seasons
Western Kentucky
Western Kentucky Basketball, Men's
Western Kentucky Basketball, Men's